MotorSport Ranch is an auto racing facility located in Cresson, Texas  southwest of Fort Worth. The membership-based track is described as a country club with a road course instead of a golf course, and features three track layouts, a skidpad, garages, a clubhouse, and on-site businesses.

History 
Founder and president Jack Farr felt inspired to open a venue for safe and accessible road racing after attending a driving school and realizing the lack of such a place for racing drivers or enthusiasts, including over 20 failed road course projects in the DFW area. Farr envisioned MotorSport Ranch operating as country club but with a road course instead of a golf course, where members pay an initial fee plus monthly fees to maintain membership. In 1996 Farr purchased the land in Cresson that was once a working cattle ranch. Over the next four years, $4 million, and five revisions of the layout, the first  track opened in July 1999 with five members. By the end of 2002 the second  track opened and the club had 353 members. In 2007 membership grew to 670.

The track has hosted press events, One Lap of America, LATAM Challenge Series, Formula Sun Grand Prix, HPDE events, SCCA Track Night in America, and many other racing series.

A reality TV show of the same name aired 13 episodes between 2005 and 2007.

Track facilities 
The property is split east and west between Johnson and Hood counties, respectively.

Those two tracks combine to form the third track  in length, one of the longest in North America.

The track is open to members 40 weekends per year and also rents to driving schools, tire and car manufacturers, race teams. The facility is home to several on-site motorsports businesses such as Texas Autosports, builder for Formula Mazda. The facility also includes 300 garages, a covered grid pad, skid pad, and a clubhouse with observation deck.

References

External links 

Buildings and structures in Hood County, Texas
Buildings and structures in Johnson County, Texas
Motorsport venues in Texas